Haemonides candida is a moth in the Castniidae family. It is found in Peru and Guyana.

Subspecies
Haemonides candida candida (Peru)
Haemonides candida houlbertina Lamas, 1995 (Guyana)

References

Castniidae
Moths of South America
Moths described in 1917